The Pyeongtaek–Siheung Expressway (Korean: 평택시흥고속도로; Pyeongtaek-Siheung Gosok Doro), Also 2nd Seohaean Expressway, is an expressway in South Korea, connecting Pyeongtaek to Hwaseong, Ansan, and Siheung. It has Expressway Route No. 153 and is a Branch Line of Seohaean Expressway. The entire length from Pyeongtaek to Siheung is 42.6 km and the posted speed limit is 100 km/h.

History 
 31 March 2008: Construction Begin
 28 March 2013: Open to traffic.

Compositions

Lanes 
 W.Pyeongtaek JC ~ S.Ansan IC : 4
 S.Ansan IC ~ Gunja JC : 6

Length 
39.4 km

Limited Speed 
 W.Pyeongtaek JC ~ Gunja JC : 100 km/h

List of facilities 

IC: Interchange, JC: Junction, SA: Service Area, TG:Tollgate

Expressways in South Korea
Roads in Gyeonggi